Diapensia is a genus of flowering plants of the family Diapensiaceae. Most of the species are found in the Himalayas. Diapensia lapponica has a high Arctic, circumpolar distribution.

Species 
Diapensia obovata, which is found in Asia and western North America, is now generally considered to be Diapensia lapponica subsp. obovata, which would make the European and eastern North American Diapensia lapponica into Diapensia lapponica subsp. lapponica. Species currently accepted by The Plant List, are as follows: 
Diapensia himalaica Hook.f. & Thomson
Diapensia lapponica L.
Diapensia purpurea Diels
Diapensia wardii W.E.Evans

References 

Diapensiaceae
Taxa named by Carl Linnaeus
Ericales genera